is an action, maze game, part of the Bomberman series, released for the Super NES in 1993. It is the first in the series to be released in Europe keeping the Bomberman title instead of being called Dynablaster or Eric and the Floaters.

Super Bomberman spawned its own series of sequels; including Super Bomberman 2, Super Bomberman 3, Super Bomberman 4, Super Bomberman 5, Super Bomberman R, and Super Bomberman R Online.

Gameplay 

The game takes place on a single non-scrolling screen. The screen shows the top down view of a grid of 143 (13 x 11) squares. The grid restricts the movement of characters so they can only move horizontally or vertically around the screen. Pressing a button will make Bomberman drop a bomb at his feet. This bomb will pulse for a few seconds (giving the player time to run away) and then explode, shooting flames horizontally and vertically. The game revolves around the idea of using these bomb blasts to destroy walls and enemies. If a bomb explodes and the flame hits another bomb it will cause this second bomb to detonate early. This can cause large chain reactions. If the flame from any bomb hits any character it will injure or kill them (unless they are currently invincible).

Most levels start with the grid being partially filled with destructible soft walls. If a bomb blast hits one of these soft walls, then it disintegrates, allowing characters to pass through the now empty space. Once a bomb is laid, it is usually impossible to walk past until it has detonated. This leads to the tactic of trapping enemies with bombs and forcing them into bomb blasts but can also result in the player's defeat. Special items can be picked up by walking over icons on the screen. These items are normally revealed when destroying walls or killing enemies. There are many different items which give the player different abilities; these change a player's tactics and the way the game is played.

Normal Game
Normal Game consists of six themed worlds each with its own set of enemies. Each world has eight stages with the last stage being a boss fight.

The player makes progress through the game by clearing all the enemies from the stage and then exiting via a door that is hidden under one of the destructible walls.

World 5 differs from the rest in that the player fights robot Bombermen in an arena. The arena has no destructible walls or exit doors. The end of each stage is not defined like the other worlds. Instead, once the arena has been cleared of one set of robot Bombermen, then the next set walk into the arena, thus making this world one continuous battle.

The normal game can be played by one or two players. In two-player mode the aim is to work cooperatively to defeat the enemies, although it is still possible to blow up one's teammate with one's own bombs.

The game utilized a password system to save progress. Each stage provided a four-digit password that would allow the player to return to that stage by entering it on the Options screen.

Battle Mode
Battle Mode is played by one to four players, either human or computer controlled. Because the standard SNES control deck only has two controller ports, in order to play with more than two human players, a multitap device is required.

The battle takes place on one of twelve themed stages. The aim is to blow up the other players while staying alive. All bomb blasts are instantly fatal in Battle Mode.
If one of the players are the last player remaining they win the round and receive a gold trophy. The overall winner is the first person to win a set number of gold trophies (i.e. the first person to win a certain number of rounds). The number of trophies needed is configurable when starting the game and ranges from 1 to 5.

Each round has a time limit of two minutes. If nobody has won after two minutes then the round is declared a draw and no trophies are given. It is also possible for a draw to occur if all remaining players are blown up at the same time.

After a minute and a half the game displays a message to "Hurry Up!" and then starts dropping indestructible walls around the edge of the play field (starting bottom left and travelling clockwise), effectively reducing the area players can move around in. If the player gets hit by falling walls, they'll get killed instantly.

Battle Mode can be extremely fast-paced and hectic, reflected in the fast-paced music score that accompanies it. The Speed Round, which is Stage 12, is considered to be the most competitive as it requires a large amount of skill to control the fast-paced players and bomb detonation.

Special items appears during the gameplay for ammo supply as players destroy walls, enemies, or opponent Bombermen. During a Normal Game, the effects of all items except firepower, number of bombs, and speed will be lost when the player loses a life. During a Battle Game, the effects of all the items last for one battle only. Only items such as Ice Cream, Pancakes, Apples (Etc.) give points and other items such as a clock that adds additional time to the game time.

Plot

The game's story takes place in the far to the north of Bomberman's hometown, Peace Town, where it lies the modern metropolis Diamond City. There, the evil Carat Diamond and his cohort, scientist Dr. Mook, are holding a Robot Tournament with robots specially designed for their combat and offensive capabilities. They hope to steal Bomberman's advanced combat capabilities, Diamond has created a fake Bomberman to go to Peace Town and kidnap the real Bomberman. They're aware of Diamond's plot, Black Bomberman heads out alone to face the fake Bomberman. But Black Bomberman is defeated and his castle is taken. However, Black Bomberman escapes and seeks refuge with White Bomberman, and warns him of Diamond's evil plan. Later, hordes of enemy robots begin their advance toward Peace Town. The two heroes must join forces to defeat Diamond.

Development

Super Multitap
Super Bomberman was originally bundled with a multitap device to allow more than two players to play simultaneously. The Super Multitap was long and grey with four controller ports in a row on one side. It plugged into either of the controller ports on the SNES deck. This meant a total of five controllers could be plugged in with the fifth controller plugged into second port on the SNES. Although Super Bomberman, as well as Super Bomberman 2, only allowed the use of the first four controllers to play the game, other Bomberman games: Super Bomberman 3, Super Bomberman 4 and Super Bomberman 5 allowed to use three to five controllers and the fifth controller would allow a sound test to be accessed by pressing the right shoulder button on the options screen.

Hudson Soft later released a second multitap (the Super Multitap 2) on its own for people that had purchased Super Bomberman unbundled, or one of the other multitap enabled games. This second version was designed in the shape of a Bomberman's head and had the two controller ports on the front and one on each side. It was also designed to be used with future games. Eventually there were 54 Super NES games that utilised the multitap. However, they were predominantly sports games.

Reception 

Super Bomberman was met with very positive reception from critics on both the Super Nintendo Entertainment System and J2ME.

The four reviewers of Electronic Gaming Monthly gave Super Bomberman a unanimous score of 9 out of 10 and their "Game of the Month" award, and asserted that the game's addictiveness is on the same order as that of Tetris. They further commented that the game is great fun even in single player mode, but that the highlight is the multiplayer.

Game Informer ranked it the 90th best game ever made in 2001. They claimed that its multi-player mode resulted in missed deadlines at video game magazines and development studios due to its quality. In 2011, IGN rated the game 49th on their "Top 100 SNES Games of All Time". In 2018, Complex rated Super Bomberman 37th on their The Best Super Nintendo Games of All Time and they opined the game is "probably best four-player game for the SNES."
The game went on to sell over 918,484 copies in Japan alone and it also received a Platinum Editor's Choice.

See also
 List of Bomberman video games

Notes

References

External links 
 Super Bomberman - Hudson Game Navi at Hudson Soft (Japanese) on Wayback Machine
 Super Bomberman at GameFAQs
 Super Bomberman at Giant Bomb
 Super Bomberman at MobyGames

1993 video games
Action video games
Bomberman
Cooperative video games
Epic/Sony Records games
Hudson Soft games
Maze games
Mobile games
Multiplayer and single-player video games
Produce! games
Super Nintendo Entertainment System games
Video games developed in Japan
Video games scored by Jun Chikuma
J2ME games